Papyrus Oxyrhynchus 294 (P. Oxy. 294 or P. Oxy. II 294) is a letter from Alexandria, in Greek. It was discovered in Oxyrhynchus. The manuscript was written on papyrus in the form of a sheet. It was written at 11 December 22. Currently it is housed in the Princeton University Library (AM 4402) in Princeton.

Description 
The measurements of the fragment are 231 by 130 mm.

The document was written by Serapion.

This papyrus was discovered by Grenfell and Hunt in 1897 in Oxyrhynchus. The text was published by Grenfell and Hunt in 1899.

See also 
 Oxyrhynchus Papyri

References 

294
1st-century manuscripts
Princeton University